The Blue Chair is the fifth solo album by Kieran Kane, his third for Dead Reckoning Records, the label founded by Kane in 1994 along with fellow musicians Kevin Welch, Mike Henderson, Tammy Rogers, and Harry Stinson. Robert Wooldridge reviewed The Blue Chair on Country Standard Time website favorably, stating "Though unlikely to bring Kane the commercial success he enjoyed with The O'Kanes, this release reinforces Kane's reputation as one of today's best alt.-country singer-songwriters."

Track listing

Track information and credits taken from the album's liner notes.

Musicians
Kieran Kane: Vocals, Guitar (Gut String), Acoustic Guitar, mandolin (Octave), Percussion
Glenn Worf: Bass
Harry Stinson: Drums, Percussion, Backing vocals on tracks 5, 7, 8
Dan Dugmore: Electric Guitar, Acoustic Guitar, Guitar (Gut String), Steel Guitar (Pedal), Resonator Guita
John Jarvis: Piano, Organ (B3)
Steve Mandile: Synthesizer on track 6
Allison Moorer: Backing vocals on track 5
Claudia Scott: Backing vocals on tracks 7, 8
Kevin Welch: Backing vocals on tracks 4, 5
Kieran Kane: Backing vocals on track 9
Kim Keys: Backing vocals on track 6
Tabitha Fair: Backing vocals on track 6

Production
Kieran Kane: Cover Painting
Brydget Carrillo: Design
Brent Maher: Engineer
Nils Logan:Engineer
Dave Shipley: Master
Mils Logan: Recorder, Mixer
Brydget Carrillo: Photography
Philip Scoggins: Recorder
Recorded and mixed at Creative Workshop
Additional recording at Moraine Music Group
Mastered at Foxwood Music

References

External links
Dead Reckoning Records Official Site

2000 albums
Kieran Kane albums
Dead Reckoning Records albums